Berth 24 is a 1950 British documentary produced by British Transport Films and directed by J B Holmes, concerning Hull Docks and specifically the unloading and reloading of a ship, the SS Bravo heading back to Gothenburg. The leisurely 40 minute original was somewhat long in its capacity as a "filler" between feature films in the days when a ticket bought an A movie and a B-movie. It was rereleased as a 15 minute film entitled Dockers at Work in 1953.

The documentary was broadcast in UK on 25 February 2021 on Talking Pictures TV.

"Berth 24" is also included in the British Transport Films Collection, Volume Nine
"Just The Ticket" ( which as of June 2022 appears to be currently unavailable )

Overview
The film begins with two officials in an office overlooking the dock, deciding he logistics of getting a new ship berthed in the busy dock. Unloading must be co-ordinated with he arrival of a freight train which must be directed to the correcting siding in the docks.

The ship is emptied of its huge cargo of timber and grain. The grain is shown being pushed by below deck "ploughmen" who use huge paddles to push the grain into the central device from which it is sucked out of the ship and over to the grain elevator on the docks.

A prize bull makes its way from the farm to the dockyard. It is hoisted into the hold then pulled by the ring in its nose into a small pen.

The ship hoists the Blue Peter flag showing it is ready to leave and stevedores manhandle the final large crates in the hold o optimise space. More lorry-loads of goods arrive. They keep loading until the ship is scheduled to leave i.e. if a lorry is late it leaves without those goods rather than wait.

Time to leave counts down. Tarpaulins are pulled over the holds and the crew leave. A tug appears to guide the ship out of the dock.

The dockside warehouse is empty. The tug heads back into harbour as the Bravo leaves the estuary into the North Sea. The pilot heads back to his ship.

Ships Featured

SS Bravo registered in Hull
SS Angelo
SS Kitty

Cast

The film is almost entirely the actual dock employees other than the Swedish man buying the bull, who is played by Richard Huson. The musical score is by John Greenwood.

References
 

British documentary films
1950 films
British Transport Films
1950s British films